Eddie Brooks (2 June 1950 – 1 July 2022) was an Australian water polo player. He competed in the men's tournament at the 1976 Summer Olympics.

References

External links
  Retrieved 14 July 2022.

1950 births
2022 deaths
Australian male water polo players
Olympic water polo players of Australia
Water polo players at the 1976 Summer Olympics
Place of birth missing